New York's 22nd State Senate district is one of 63 districts in the New York State Senate. It has  been represented by Democrat Andrew Gounardes since 2019, following his defeat of incumbent Republican Marty Golden.

Geography
District 22 is located in southern Brooklyn, encompassing the neighborhoods of Bay Ridge, Dyker Heights, Bensonhurst, Bath Beach, Gravesend, Gerritsen Beach, Manhattan Beach, and Marine Park.

The district overlaps with New York's 7th, 8th, 9th, 10th, and 11th congressional districts, and with the 41st, 45th, 46th, 47th, 48th, 49th, 51st, 59th, and 64th districts of the New York State Assembly.

Recent election results

2020

2018

2016

2014

2012

Federal results in District 22

References

22